= Ajim Khan =

Ajim Khan اجم خان
- Location within Pakistan
- Coordinates: 32.43°N 69.47°E
- Country: Pakistan
- Territory: Federally Administered Tribal Areas
- Elevation: 1,814 m (5,951 ft)
- Time zone: UTC+5 (PST)
  - Summer (DST): UTC+6 (PDT)

Ajim Khan (Urdu: اجم خان) is a town in the Federally Administered Tribal Areas of Pakistan. It is located at 32°25'39N 69°28'13E with an altitude of 1814 metres (5954 feet).
